Lake Higa is a small lake in eastern Burkina Faso, close to the border with Niger. It drains into the Babangou, which drains into the Niger. It has an area of 228 ha. It lies at an elevation of 271 m (889 feet). In 2009 the site around Lake Higa was included in the List of Ramsar wetlands of international importance.

References

Higa
Higa